Senator Tenorio may refer to:

Froilan Tenorio (born 1939), Senate of the Northern Mariana Islands
Pedro Tenorio (1934–2018), Senate of the Northern Mariana Islands
Ray Tenorio (born 1965), Senate of Guam